Posten Norge is the name of the Norwegian postal service.  The company, owned by the Norwegian Ministry of Transport and Communications had a monopoly until 2016 on distribution of letters weighing less than 50g throughout the country. There are 30 post offices in Norway, in addition to 1400 outlets in retail stores.

History
Posten was founded in January 1647 as Postvesenet ("the postal system") by general post master Henrik Morian. It was established as a private company, and King Christian IV gave his blessing to the founding of the company. Postvesenet was privately run until 1719, when the state took over. From that point on, national postal service was a state monopoly. Local city postal services remained private, but in 1888 a new postal law was introduced which expanded the monopoly to the entire country.

In 1933, Postvesenet was renamed Postverket. In 1996, Posten Norge BA was established as a state-owned company in which the Norwegian state had limited liability. In 2002 Posten changed its corporate structure to that of a stock company, to prepare the company for the expected deregulation of the Norwegian postal market. Posten Norge AS is still fully owned by the Norwegian state and the liberalization process has been postponed until 2011 by the government.

The postal service  is divided into four divisions: Post, Logistics, Distribution Network and ErgoGroup AS. The latter specialized in electronic services and outsourcing. ErgoGroup merged with EDB to form Evry ASA, which Posten now jointly owns with the Norwegian multinational telecommunications company Telenor ASA.

Expansion
In 2002 Norway Post acquired 57% of the shares of a private Swedish postal company, CityMail and acquired the remaining 43% in the first quarter of 2006. Norway Post also owns, or partly owns Nor-Cargo as well as  Frigoscandia, Pan Nordic Logistics, Scanex B.V., Nettlast Hadeland, many of which have their own subsidiaries.

See also 
PostNord Sverige, the Swedish postal service
When Harry Met Santa (TV advert for the company)
List of oldest companies

References

External links
English version of the official site of Norway Post
The four divisions
Norway Post Logistics subsidiaries

Norway
Government-owned companies of Norway
Postal system of Norway
Government agencies established in 1647
Philately of Norway
1647 establishments in Norway
Ministry of Transport (Norway)